The 2016–17 Moldovan Under-19 Division was the Moldovan annual football tournament. The season began on 4 September 2016 and ended on 29 May 2017. Sheriff Tiraspol were the defending champions.

Squads
Players must be born on or after 1 January 1999, with a maximum of five players per team born between 1 January 1998 and 31 December 1998 allowed.

Stadia and locations

Format

In the initial phase of the season, each of the eight teams play the other seven teams two times. After 14 rounds, the league splits into two sections, a top four and a bottom four, with each team playing all the other teams in their section twice.

League table

Results

Matches 1–14
Teams play each other twice, once at home and once away.

Matches 15–20
Teams play each other twice, once at home and once away.

Top four

Matches 15–20
Teams play each other twice, once at home and once away.

Bottom four

References

2016–17 in Moldovan football